Sagenocrinites is an extinct genus of crinoid from the Silurian period. During the Silurian period, a sea-covered Britain that was shallower in the south and deeper in the north lay south of the equator with a tropical to sub-tropical climate. Therefore, in the United Kingdom, amongst Silurian fossils, such as brachiopods, trilobites and graptolites, coral-like organisms like Sagenocrinites can be found.

Because this species belongs to a genus of crinoids which is very sensitive concerning the environmental influences their petrified remains can therefore be viewed as indicators of the climate conditions. By using a geological world map, these fossils will help to create a complex climate model, tracing back more than 400 million years to the ancient Earth. With a high accuracy it will be possible to reconstruct the climate history of our planet.

References

 Fossils (Smithsonian Handbooks) by David Ward (Page 168)
 "Fossil Field Guide" by Peter Sheldon, chapter 27

External links
Sagenocrinites in the Paleobiology Database

Sagenocrinida
Prehistoric crinoid genera
Silurian echinoderms of North America
Silurian echinoderms of Europe